Eucalyptus yumbarrana, commonly known as the Yumbarra mallee is a species of mallee that is endemic to South Australia. It has rough, flaky bark on the lower trunk, smooth bark above, egg-shaped to lance-shaped adult leaves, flower buds in groups of seven, creamy white to yellow flowers and shortened spherical to cup-shaped fruit.

Description
It has fibrous-stringy bark on the trunk and lower stems, smooth grey to cream-coloured bark above and that is shed in ribbons that often hang in the upper branches. Flowering occurs from July to October and the flowers are creamy white to yellow.

Taxonomy and naming
Eucalyptus yumbarrana was first formally described in 1979 by Clifford David Boomsma in the Journal of the Adelaide Botanic Gardens from specimens collected in Yumbarra Conservation Park in 1977. The specific epithet (yumbarrana) is a reference to the type location.

Distribution and habitat
Eucalyptus yumbarrana is often found in the swales between sand dunes in open shrubland in arid areas in the Yumbarra and Koonibba areas.

See also
List of Eucalyptus species

References

Trees of Australia
yumbarrana
Myrtales of Australia
Flora of South Australia
Plants described in 1979